The Rotbüelspitz (also spelled Rotbühelspitze) is a mountain of the Silvretta Alps, located on the border between Austria and Switzerland. It is located north of the slightly higher Isentällispitz.

References

External links
 Rotbüelspitz on Hikr

Mountains of the Alps
Mountains of Graubünden
Mountains of Vorarlberg
Austria–Switzerland border
International mountains of Europe
Mountains of Switzerland
Silvretta Alps
Klosters-Serneus